The 8.8 cm SK C/35 was a German naval gun used in World War II.

Description
The gun fired a  projectile 88 mm in diameter, and the barrel is sometimes described as 45 caliber. Useful life expectancy was 12,000 effective full charges (EFC) per barrel.

Ammunition
The gun was able to fire
 Armor Piercing (AP) - 
 High Explosive (HE) - 
 Illumination (ILLUM) - 
The High Explosive (HE) round has a muzzle velocity of

History

Naval guns
This was the standard deck gun mounted forward of the conning tower in Type VII boats, although a few substituted a high-angle 8.8 cm SK C/30 naval gun for anti-aircraft defense. The SK C/35 was designed for the prototype VIIA boats of 1935 with a nominal ammunition allowance of 220 rounds. During the early war years, these guns were used to encourage surrender of independently routed merchant ships or to sink ships damaged by torpedoes. Some of these guns were later removed from U-boats for mounting aboard minesweepers and submarine chasers after unshielded deck guns proved impractical in action against Defensively Equipped Merchant Ships and escorted trade convoys.

See also
 List of naval guns

Notes

References

References

External links

 SK C/35 at Navweaps.com

88 mm artillery
Naval guns of Germany
Military equipment introduced in the 1930s